Zoop in Africa is a 2005 Dutch adventure film directed by Dennis Bots and Johan Nijenhuis. The film is based on the TV series Zoop and is followed by Zoop in India (2006) and Zoop in South America (2007). The film was recorded on multiple locations in South Africa.
 
The film premiered on July 10, 2005 at the Tuschinski theatre in Amsterdam.

Plot 

Eight youngsters studying for zookeeper in the Netherlands travel to Africa, to work in a wildpark and enhance their knowledge. During the flight to their destination their plane crashes in the middle of the jungle and they are completely dependent on each other. They decide to split up in two groups in the search for help. Aside from the survival challenge, the owners of the wildpark want to get rid of the rangers too. When Bionda gets lost, things go from bad to worse. Then they encounter an African tribe who doesn't have good intentions either.

Cast 
 Viviënne van den Assem (Elise Pardoel)
 Juliette van Ardenne (Sira Schilt)
 Nicolette van Dam (Bionda Kroonenberg)
 Ewout Genemans (Bastiaan van Diemen)
 Jon Karthaus (Moes Brinksma)
 Patrick Martens (Mike Bosboom)
 Monique van der Werff (Taffie Arends)
 Sander Jan Klerk (Aaron Zomerkamp)
 Sylvana Simons (Safira)
 Gys de Villiers (Cornelis de Groot)
 Sabine Koning (Gaby Komproe)
 Raymi Sambo (Bowey Berenger)
 Ernst Löw (Siegfried Schilt)
 Pieternel Pouwels (Maxime Schilt)
 Kim Boekhoorn (Filo Schilt)

Awards
The film received a Golden Film and a "Nickelodeon Kid's Choice Award"

References

External links

2005 films
2000s adventure comedy films
Dutch adventure comedy films
2000s Dutch-language films
Zulu-language films
2000s English-language films
Films set in Africa
Films based on television series
2005 comedy films
Films directed by Dennis Bots
Films directed by Johan Nijenhuis
2005 multilingual films
Dutch multilingual films